Opuntia cochenillifera is a species of cactus in the subfamily Opuntioideae. It is endemic to Mexico, and is the most common species in Jamaica. The first description was in 1753 by Carl Linnaeus as Cactus cochenillifer. Philip Miller described it as Opuntia cochenillifera in 1768.

References

External links
 Plants Profile for Opuntia cochenillifera (cochineal nopal cactus)
 Opuntia cochenillifera - Species Page - ISB: Atlas of Florida Plants

Plants described in 1753
Taxa named by Carl Linnaeus
cochenillifera
Endemic flora of Mexico
Taxa named by Philip Miller